Yunus-bek Bamatgireyevich Yevkurov (born 23 July 1963) is a Russian colonel general politician. He was the head of the southern Russian republic of Ingushetia, appointed by President Dmitry Medvedev, from 31 October 2008 to 24 June 2019. The following day, the People's Assembly of the Republic of Ingushetia, the republic's regional parliament, voted in favor of Yevkurov's appointment, making him the third Head of Ingushetia. He is a career soldier, paratrooper, and Hero of the Russian Federation who was involved in numerous conflicts where Russia played a key role, including Kosovo (1999) and Chechnya. On 22 June 2009, Yevkurov was seriously injured following a car-bomb attack on his motorcade in the city of Nazran.

As head of Ingushetia, Yevkurov claimed he had succeeded in stabilising the crime situation and bringing about positive social changes within the Russian republic. Since September 2018, he faced opposition at home, following the controversial land transfer deal with the neighboring Republic of Chechnya.

He was appointed as a Deputy Defence Minister by President Putin on 8 July 2019.

Early life
Yevkurov, an ethnic Ingush, was born on 23 July 1963 into a peasant family of 12 children, consisting of five sisters and six brothers. He graduated from the same school that was later the scene of the Beslan massacre.

Military service
Yevkurov was conscripted by the Soviet Army in 1982, serving in the Naval Infantry of the Pacific Fleet. In 1989, he graduated from the Ryazan Guards Higher Airborne Command School. Yevkurov continued his military education, graduating from the Frunze Military Academy in 1997 and from the General Staff Academy in 2004.

In June 1999, Yevkurov was stationed in the Bosnian town of Ugljevik with the Russian peacekeepers under the auspices of SFOR. On 12 June, he led a task force on a swift 500-km-long march, which aimed to secure the Pristina International Airport ahead of the NATO troops, thus ensuring a Russian presence in Kosovo after the NATO bombing of Yugoslavia. This led to a standoff with NATO troops.

Yevkurov has had various positions of command within the Russian Airborne Troops and has participated in counterterrorist operations in the North Caucasus. During the course of the Second Chechen War in 2000, he was in command of the 217th Guards Airborne Regiment (98th Guards Airborne Division). While on a reconnaissance mission, Yevkurov's team discovered a house where a group of captured Russian soldiers was held. Having neutralized the guards and infiltrated the building, the team was surrounded by Chechen reinforcements, resulting in armed combat. The Russian troops were able to break through the encirclement while Yevkurov was providing cover for the evacuation of the wounded. He personally carried a soldier to safety despite sustaining an injury himself. Twelve imprisoned soldiers were rescued. On 13 April 2000, Yevkurov, for his courage, was presented with the Hero of Russia award, the country's highest title of honor.

In 2004, Yevkurov was appointed to be the Intelligence Division Deputy Commander of the Volga-Urals Military District.

Political career
On 30 October 2008, Yevkurov replaced the highly unpopular Murat Zyazikov as the head of Ingushetia. Zyazikov's dismissal and Yevkurov's appointment were received with much enthusiasm from the Ingush population.

Assassination attempt
On 22 June 2009, Yevkurov was seriously injured following a car-bomb attack on his motorcade in the city of Nazran at roughly 08:20 local time (04:20 GMT). In the incident, a Toyota Camry filled with explosives rammed the Yevkurov's convoy in what is believed to be a suicide bomb attack. One escorting policeman died on the spot; Yevkurov's driver and cousin Ramzan died a few days later in a hospital. Yevkurov's brother Uvais was among the injured. Yevkurov suffered a ruptured liver, a severe concussion, and several cracked ribs, but was expected to survive following surgery. Yevkurov was then airlifted to a hospital in Moscow and was sent to intensive care with damage to his skull and internal organs, according to the New York Times.

Though no group has yet claimed responsibility, Russian President Dmitry Medvedev accused Islamist militants of carrying out the attack, condemning the "terrorist attack". Speaking on Russian television, Medvedev claimed that Yevkurov "did a lot to restore order ... and the bandits obviously didn't like that kind of activity". Russian news agency RIAN, quoting an unnamed Kremlin source, reported that executive authority in Ingushetia has been temporarily transferred to the prime minister, Rashid Gaisanov, who became acting Head by Russian presidential decree. The source claimed that "President Medvedev authorized Gaysanov to take operative management of the republic, and he has all the required authority for that". Gaisanov remained the acting head of Ingushetia until Yevkurov returned to office.

The attack followed other attacks on republic officials in June 2009. On 10 June, the deputy chief justice of the Ingushetian Supreme Court, Aza Gazgireyeva, was gunned down in Nazran shortly after dropping her children off at school, and on 13 June the former deputy prime minister, Bashir Aushev, was shot dead outside his home.

After the attack, Chechen leader Ramzan Kadyrov claimed the Kremlin had ordered him to fight insurgents in Ingushetia, and during his subsequent visit to Ingushetia on 24 June pledged to revenge ruthlessly. On 4 July, a convoy of Chechen troops sent by Kadyrov into Ingushetia in response to the suicide bombing was ambushed by militants. The attack caused nine Chechen deaths, with 10 others severely wounded.

On 9 July, Ingushetia's Interior Ministry announced the arrest of several suspects, including the Chechen rebel commander Rustaman Makhauri, allegedly involved in the attack on Yevkurov.

Yevkurov regained consciousness from a coma two weeks after the attack. Yevkurov was released from the hospital in Moscow on 12 August 2009, more than seven weeks after the attack, but continued to receive rehabilitation. Speaking to reports upon leaving the hospital, Yevkurov warned that "those who refuse to lay down their arms and surrender will be killed."

By September, 2009, Yevkurov had returned to his position of head of the republic.

Till resignation
In July 2013, he announced his own resignation following the upcoming elections to the Ingush presidency, though he remained the acting head until the elections.

He was re-elected in the 2013 Ingush Head election. In the 2018 Russian gubernatorial elections, he was re-elected as the Head of the Republic by 26 out of 32 members of the People's Assembly of the Republic of Ingushetia.

Yevkurov stepped down from his position permanently on 24 June 2019 after months of controversy over the land swap agreement with Chechnya signed in September 2018.

Relations to religious authorities of Ingushetia 
Yevkurov had a decade-old spat with Ingushetian religious leadership from his appointment until he was excommunicated by the local Muftiate in 2018. Accordingly to The Muslim Spiritual Center of Ingushetia he is no longer being able to participate in their wedding or funeral ceremonies.
Yevkurov decided to legalize the republic’s non-violent Salafist community and include their mosques into the Muftiate. Ingushetian official religious leaders traditionally follow the Qadiria and Naqshbandia schools of Sufism. He also banned building a new mosque in Magas and ordered that all sermons in the republic’s mosques be video recorded for later review.

Defence Ministry role

Yevkurov was appointed as a Deputy Defence Minister by a decree of President Vladimir Putin on 8 July 2019, also being promoted to lieutenant general. On 8 December 2021, he was further promoted to the rank of colonel general.

Personal life
Yevkurov married Mareta on 23 December 2007. They are parents of five children. Their first son was born on 1 November 2008. His nephew Captain Adam Khamkhoev was a commander of an airborne assault company and died on 21 May 2022 during the 2022 Russian invasion of Ukraine.

Honours and awards
 Hero of the Russian Federation
 Order of Courage
 Order of Military Merit
 Order of the Red Star
 Medal For Courage, twice

References

1963 births
Living people
Frunze Military Academy alumni
Heads of Ingushetia
Heroes of the Russian Federation
Ingush people
Military Academy of the General Staff of the Armed Forces of Russia alumni
People from Prigorodny District, North Ossetia–Alania
People of the Chechen wars
Recipients of the Order of Courage
Recipients of the Order of Military Merit (Russia)
Recipients of the Medal "For Courage" (Russia)
Deputy Defence Ministers of Russia
Soviet Navy personnel
Survivors of terrorist attacks
Russian Sunni Muslims
Ryazan Guards Higher Airborne Command School alumni